The  National Audit Office (Sinhala: ජාතික විගණන කාර්යාලය jātika vigaṇana kāryālaya) is a non-ministerial government department in Sri Lanka. Established in 1799, it is one of the oldest government departments in the country, and is responsible for auditing public organisations. These include all departments of Government, the Offices of the Cabinet of Ministers, the Judicial Service Commission, the Public Service Commission, the Parliamentary Commissioner for Administration, the Secretary-General of Parliament and the Commissioner of Elections, local authorities, public corporations and business or other undertakings vested in the Government under any written law. 

The head of the department is the Auditor General of Sri Lanka, currently Chulantha Wickramaratne.

See also
Auditor General of Sri Lanka

References

Government departments of Sri Lanka
Sri Lanka
Supreme audit institutions
1799 establishments in Asia
1799 establishments in the British Empire
18th-century establishments in Sri Lanka